Qué pasa may refer to:
Quepasa, a website
¿Qué Pasa, USA?, a bilingual sitcom
Qué Pasa (newspaper), Spanish-language newspaper from North Carolina
Que Pasa Radio, Spanish-language radio station from North Carolina
Qué Pasa (magazine), a Chilean right-wing political magazine

See also
What's up (disambiguation)